Yukawa (written: 湯川) is a Japanese surname, but is also applied to proper nouns.

People
 Diana Yukawa (born 1985), Anglo-Japanese solo violinist. She has had two solo albums with BMG Japan, one of which opened to #1
 Hideki Yukawa (1907–1981), Japanese theoretical physicist and the first Japanese Nobel laureate
 Morio Yukawa (1908–1988), Japanese economist and diplomat
 Tsutomu Yukawa (1911-1942), Japanese aikidoka

Fictional characters

Places
 Yukawa Institute for Theoretical Physics, a research institute in the field of theoretical physics, attached to Kyoto University in Japan
 Yukawa Station, a train station in Nachikatsuura, Higashimuro District, Wakayama Prefecture, Japan

Other
 Yukawa interaction, named after Hideki Yukawa, is an interaction between a scalar field φ and a Dirac field Ψ of a particular type
 Yukawa potential, a potential of a particular form
 Yukawa–Tsuno equation, first developed in 1959, is a linear free-energy relationship in physical organic chemistry
 Yukawa Dam

Japanese-language surnames